Aero Continente Chile was a passenger airline from Chile, that operated scheduled domestic and international flights out of Arturo Merino Benítez International Airport on behalf of its parent company, Aero Continente from Peru.

History

In 1999, Aero Continente decided to set up a subsidiary in Chile in order to get access to the Chilean domestic market, in addition to its native Peruvian one, where it was just about to acquire a monopoly position at that time. Thus, Aero Continente Chile was founded, operating domestic flights within Chile under different airline codes than its parent. From 2000, it also operated international flights to Miami, which were routed via Lima in order to connect with the feeder flights of Aero Continente there.

In 2002, the company was grounded by Chilean authorities over allegations of illegal drug trade involving Fernando Zevallos, the airline's founder. Aero Continente claimed that this was rather a measure of protecting LAN Airlines from the competition, but ultimately decided to re-integrate the Chilean subsidiary back into the mainline business.

Destinations

Fleet
Aero Continente Chile operated a fleet that consisted of 5 Boeing 737-200 and 1 Boeing 767-200ER. All aircraft had been handed down from mainline Aero Continente.

See also
List of defunct airlines of Chile

References

Defunct airlines of Chile
Airlines established in 1999
Airlines disestablished in 2002
2002 disestablishments in Chile
Chilean companies established in 1999